Home Farm, also known as the Mirriam-Bartholomew House, is a historic home and farm complex located at East Whitehall in Washington County, New York. The house was built about 1840 and consists of a two-story, five bay, center entrance brick main block with a rear brick kitchen wing in the Greek Revival style.  The farm complex has 17 contributing resources including a frame cow barn complex, a timber frame horse and carriage barn, a light frame creamery, a light-frame sugar house, and a brick smoke house.

It was listed on the National Register of Historic Places in 2008.

References

Farms on the National Register of Historic Places in New York (state)
Greek Revival houses in New York (state)
Houses completed in 1840
Houses in Washington County, New York
National Register of Historic Places in Washington County, New York